Topaana is situated in Skopje in North Macedonia. It is an area situated next to the Main Road called Bulevar Nikola Karev on the south and Dzon Kenedi on the North. Topaana is a mainly residential area and is renowned for its large Roma community

Internet 

Topaana, as all areas of Skopje has full Wi-Fi access and other forms of Broadband access. There are internet cafes in the area which all provide fast internet access. Most of the Internet in North Macedonia is Wi-Fi as a project involving North Macedonia and Motorola enabled wireless internet throughout the whole of the country.

Shopping 

There are a variety of stores in this small part of Skopje, shops include Groceries, Food Stores, Automobile Garages, Car washes, tobacco retailers, general stores, and some others.

References

Neighbourhoods of Skopje